Glipa ornata is a species of beetle in the genus Glipa. It was described in 1895.

References

ornata
Beetles described in 1895